The 2013 mayoral election in Atlanta, Georgia took place on November 5, 2013 alongside other Atlanta municipal races.  Incumbent Mayor Kasim Reed faced no serious opposition and was re-elected with 84% of the vote.  He was sworn in for his second term on January 6, 2014.

Candidates
 Al Bartell, Green Party Candidate 
 Fraser Duke, financial planner
 Kasim Reed, incumbent Mayor first elected in 2009
 Glenn Wrightson, consultant and candidate for 2005

Results

References

2013 in Atlanta
2013 Georgia (U.S. state) elections
2013 United States mayoral elections
2013